The Lukang Artist Village is an art center in Lukang Township, Changhua County, Taiwan.

History
The area was originally the working area for fish farmers to catch mullets from river in the area and was called Sha Zhou. During the Japanese rule of Taiwan, the river was filled to construct roads and houses. After the handover of Taiwan from Japan to the Republic of China in 1945, the area was taken by the government and managed by Lukang Township Office. In 2009, the office secured a fund to refurbish the area and turn it into Lukang Artist Village. was officially opened in May 2010.

Architecture
The village consists of leisure zones, outdoor green stage etc.

Activities
The village regularly holds various activities such as art exhibitions, art and literary activities, culture trips etc.

See also
 List of tourist attractions in Taiwan

References

2010 establishments in Taiwan
Art centers in Changhua County